Mayano Top Gun（マヤノトップガン, March 24, 1992 - November 3, 2019） was a Japanese Thoroughbred racehorse. His wins included the Kikuka Sho, Arima Kinen, Takarazuka Kinen, Hanshin Daishoten and Tenno Sho. In 1995, he was awarded the JRA Award Horse of the Year and Best Three-year-old Colt.

Background
Mayano Top Gun was a chestnut horse with a white blaze and a long white stocking on his left foreleg bred in Japan by Etsuo Kawakami. He was sired by the American stallion Brian's Time, who finished second in the Preakness Stakes in 1988 before becoming a highly successful breeding stallion in Japan. His dam Alp Me Please was sired by Blushing Groom and was a half-sister of the Grand Prix de Paris winner Swink: as a descendant of the broodmare Sonrisa, she was also a distant relative of the Belmont Stakes winner Ruler on Ice.

Racing career

1995: three-year-old season
Mayano Top Gun began his career racing on dirt and won three of his nine races in the early part of 1995. He was then switched to turf being placed twice at Grade II level in September and October. He emerged as top class performer in the late autumn, winning the Kikuka Sho over 3000 metres at Kyoto on 5 November. In December he contested one of Japan's most prestigious weight-for-age races, the Arima Kinen over 2500 metres at Nakayama and won from Taiki Blizzard and Sakura Chitose O.

1996: four-year-old season
In March 1996, Mayano Top Gun was matched against the 1993 Japanese Horse of the Year Narita Brian in the Hanshin Daishoten and was beaten into second place. In June at Kyoto he recorded his biggest success as a four-year-old when he won the Takarazuka Kinen over 2200 metres, beating Sunday Branch and the mare Dance Partner. Later in the year he finished second to Bubble Gum Fellow in the Autumn edition of the Tenno Sho.

1997: five-year-old season
In March 1997, Mayano Top Gun won the Hanshin Daishoten from Big Symbol and Gigaton. A month later he contested the Spring edition of the Tenno Sho over 3200 metres at Kyoto. He won from Sakura Laurel (winner of the race in 1996) with Marvelous Sunday in third place.

Assessment and awards
In 1995, Mayano Top Gun was voted Japanese Horse of the Year and Best Three-year-old Colt.

Pedigree

References

1992 racehorse births
Racehorses bred in Japan
Racehorses trained in Japan
Thoroughbred family 14-a